Barrie "Baz" McDermott (born 22 July 1972) is a former professional rugby league footballer who played as a  in the 1990s and 2000s.

A Great Britain international representative , he played his club football at Oldham (Heritage № 970), the Wigan Warriors (Heritage № 889), the Leeds Rhinos (with whom he won both a Super League Championship and Challenge Cup Final), Bramley and the Widnes Vikings.

McDermott later became the Head of Youth Development with his former club, Leeds Rhinos, and appears as a pundit on Sky Sports. In 2006 Barrie McDermott was included in the Southstander.com Hall of Fame.

Background
McDermott was born in Oldham, Lancashire, England.

Playing career

1990s
A native of Oldham, McDermott started out with his hometown club Oldham before transferring to Wigan where he won a championship and was first picked to play for Great Britain. He had originally wished to join the army but was unable to do so after an accident with an air rifle that caused him to lose an eye. His early career wasn't short of controversy and he has been described as notorious, mostly due to his aggressive style of play. He is remembered for knocking out Paul Sironen with a high shot in the first test of the 1994 series against Australia 1994 Kangaroo tour of Great Britain and France McDermott played in all three Ashes Tests against Australia, Great Britain losing the series.

Barrie McDermott played as a substitute in Wigan's 1994–95 Regal Trophy victory, 
a 40-10 win over Warrington, and in the 1995–96 Final, a 25-16 victory over St. Helens.

McDermott joined Leeds in 1996. He missed the Rhinos' 1998 Super League Grand Final defeat bt Wigan. He played in Leeds' first Challenge Cup Final win for 21 years against the London Broncos in 1999. He scored a try at a crucial time in Leeds' 52–16 win, which was a record scoreline. In this game Leroy Rivett set a Challenge Cup record by scoring 4 tries.

McDermott was a Great Britain international, winning 17 caps. He also earned a single cap for England.

2000s
McDermott went on to represent Ireland at the 2000 Rugby League World Cup, and went on to earn 15 caps over the years. McDermott has also represented Lancashire in the Origin Series. His autobiography, Made for Rugby was published in 2004. McDermott did manage to become only the 22nd Leeds player to win the league championship and the challenge cup in 2004 when he played for the Leeds Rhinos from the interchange bench in their 2004 Super League Grand Final victory against the Bradford Bulls.

At the start of Barrie's last season with Leeds, he won the 2005 World Club Challenge. The Rhinos won the World Club Challenge against the then National Rugby League champions the Canterbury Bulldogs. They won the trophy in front of a record crowd for a World Club Challenge held in Britain. There was a 37,028 strong crowd at Elland Road.

The Rhinos looked like they were going to go onto more success in 2005 as they reached the Challenge Cup Final for the 4th time in 6 years. They were leading 24–19 with a couple of minutes to go when disaster struck as they conceded a Paul Cooke try which Danny Brough converted to give the men from the east coast the trophy, winning by a point 25–24.

The Rhinos' season went from bad to worse as they slipped up in the league allowing St Helens to finish top of the table. The Rhinos finished 2nd and so played Saint Helens at Knowsley Road for the right to go to old trafford and play in the Grand Final. The Rhinos won and so reached their second consecutive Grand Final. They had to wait and see who they would play in the Grand Final. Saints played Bradford in the Grand Final Eliminator to see who would play the Rhinos at Old Trafford. The Bulls won so it was a repeat of the 2004 Grand Final – however it wasn't to be a fairytale for the Rhinos and Barrie as the Bulls won the match 15–6.

Barrie played in 2 Grand Finals, 3 Challenge Cup Finals and a World Club Challenge. He won 1 Grand Final winners ring, a Challenge Cup winners medal and a World Club Challenge winners medal. Barrie played 283 games for Leeds scoring 40 tries including 1 hat-trick. Barrie McDermott's Testimonial match at Leeds took place in 2005. He played for the Leeds Rhinos from the interchange bench in their 2005 Super League Grand Final loss against Bradford Bulls. Although he announced his retirement from the game at the end of 2005's Super League X, McDermott played another year with the Widnes Vikings in Northern League One. After a season playing with his good friend Terry O'Connor he finally retired in 2006.

Post playing
Following retirement, Barrie initially worked in a community role at Leeds Rhinos before joining the Leeds coaching setup where he is currently the Head of Youth Development. He regularly works for Sky Sports, both as a pundit at live games and as an off-field character where he regularly appears in light-hearted features with long-time friend Terry O'Connor. He is also involved in Leeds' corporate entertainment division on match days.

Even after his playing career was over, McDermott remained involved with the Challenge Cup, one of the most prestigious knock-out tournaments in the world of rugby league. Leeds Metropolitan University, who were the main sponsors of the event in 2009, announced him as their official "Carnegie Ambassador" for the 2009 Challenge Cup.

References

Further reading

External links
Leeds Rhinos profile
 SouthStander.com Hall of Fame
 2001 Ashes profile
 RLeague.com Profile
 Exclusive Guest Speaking

1972 births
Living people
Bramley RLFC players
England national rugby league team players
English people of Irish descent
English rugby league players
Great Britain national rugby league team players
Ireland national rugby league team captains
Ireland national rugby league team players
Lancashire rugby league team players
Leeds Rhinos players
Oldham R.L.F.C. players
Rugby league players from Oldham
Rugby league props
Widnes Vikings players
Wigan Warriors players